The 1970–71 Hong Kong First Division League season was the 60th since its establishment.

League table

References

External links
1970–71 Hong Kong First Division table (RSSSF)

Hong
Hong Kong First Division League seasons
football